Streptomyces decoyicus is a bacterium species from the genus of Streptomyces which has been isolated from garden soil in California in the United States. Streptomyces decoyicus produces decoyinin and psicofuranine.

See also 
 List of Streptomyces species

References

Further reading

External links
Type strain of Streptomyces decoyicus at BacDive -  the Bacterial Diversity Metadatabase

decoyicus
Bacteria described in 2010